Stephen "Steve" Negoesco (September 12, 1925 – February 3, 2019) was a Romanian-American soccer player and coach.

Considered one of college soccer's all-time greatest coaches,  he led the University of San Francisco to more than 544 victories, five NCAA championships (the 1978 championship was later vacated because of an ineligible player), and the U.S. Open Cup.

Negoesco was the first coach in college soccer history to reach 500 career wins. He also coached several junior teams and won numerous championships.

He was inducted into The National Soccer Hall of Fame in Oneonta, New York; The West Coast Soccer Hall of Fame; The Bay Area Sports Hall of Fame; The United Soccer Coaches Hall of Fame; The WCC Hall of Honor; as well as receiving numerous awards and commendations. He was known as the "King of West Coast soccer".

His overall career record was 544–172–66.

Early life and career
Born in New Jersey, the son of a sea captain. Negoesco returned with his father to Romania after his mother's death to live with his aunt and uncle, where he discovered and took up soccer. His skills would later help him survive and escape imprisonment by the Nazis during their occupation of Romania during World War II; he was sent to a Nazi camp at 15 after the Germans discovered his American roots.  Negoesco played in the Romanian League, then returned to his birthplace in New Jersey in 1945.

Settling in California, Negoesco enrolled at the University of San Francisco in 1947 where he studied biology. He also resumed playing soccer, coached by Gus Donoghue. Negoesco led the Dons to the 1949 California collegiate title and the 1950 Soccer Bowl co-championship with Penn State, and he also earned two All-American honors during this period.

After graduating in 1951, Negoesco taught in the San Francisco Unified School District for twenty-five years. During that period he was also hired as USF's men's soccer coach in 1962, a post he would hold until his retirement in 2000.  Negoesco would go on to coach the Dons to 544 victories, 22 conference titles, and five NCAA titles (1966, 1975, 1976, 1978, and 1980), the 1978 championship was later vacated because of an ineligible player.

He made history when he won the US Open Cup championship in 1976 with the San Francisco Italian Athletic Club. It was the first time that a Northern California club lifted the US Open Cup trophy and he became the first coach in history to win a US Open Cup and an NCAA title.

Among the players he mentored were former All-Americans John Doyle, Lothar Osiander, Koulis Apostolidis and Andy Atuegbu, as well as former Peruvian president Alejandro Toledo.

Retirement and death

After his retirement from coaching men's soccer, Negoesco was inducted to the National Soccer Hall of Fame in 2003, National Soccer Coaches Association of America Hall of Fame in 2003, Bay Area Sports Hall of Fame (BASHOF) in 2010 and the West Coast Conference Hall of Honor (WCC) in 2011.

In 1982, the Negoesco Stadium on the USF campus was named in his honor.

Negoesco died on February 3, 2019, at the age of 93. He was predeceased by his wife Mercedes Coronado. Negoesco is survived by his children Stefan, Sandra, Sonia, Stuart, Sylvana, Sergio, 17 grand-children and 12 great grand-children.

Honors and awards

1947–60 Played on many Northern California All Star Teams
1948–50 All American at USF; First Team NCAA All-American player on the West Coast
1959 Member of University of San Francisco Hall of Fame
1961 Key to the City of San Francisco presented by Mayor Christopher
1970 Member of the California Soccer Federation North Hall of Fame
1977 USF Maraschi Society Award (USF)
1982 Negoesco Stadium at USF, dedicated in his honor
1983 Commended by California Governor Deukmejian
1983 Commended by United States President Ronald Reagan
1988 Father William Dunne Award (USF)
1993 West Coast Conference Coach of the Year Award
1995 Lifetime Member NSCAA
1995 NSCAA Commendation
1996 NISOA Merit Award
2000 West Coast Conference Award
2001 San Jose Earthquakes Recognition Award
2002 NCAA The Bill Jeffery Award
2003 National Soccer Hall of Fame 
2003 NSCAA Hall of Fame (National Soccer Coaches Association of America)
2010 Bay Area Sports Hall of Fame (BASHOF)
2011 WCC Hall of Honor (West Coast Conference)

References

Publications

Further reading
 

1925 births
2019 deaths
American soccer coaches
American people of Romanian descent
Soccer players from New Jersey
FC Sportul Studențesc București players
San Francisco Dons men's soccer players
San Francisco Dons men's soccer coaches
San Francisco Soccer Football League players
University of San Francisco alumni
Association football fullbacks
Romanian footballers
American soccer players